In enzymology, a biphenyl synthase is an enzyme that catalyzes the chemical reaction:

3 malonyl-CoA + benzoyl-CoA  4 CoA + 3,5-dihydroxybiphenyl + 4 CO2

Thus, the two substrates of this enzyme are malonyl-CoA and benzoyl-CoA, whereas its three products are CoA, 3,5-dihydroxybiphenyl, and CO2.

This enzyme belongs to the family of transferases, specifically those acyltransferases transferring groups other than aminoacyl groups.  The systematic name of this enzyme class is malonyl-CoA:benzoyl-CoA malonyltransferase. This enzyme is also called BIS.

References

 

EC 2.3.1